Aishbagh Stadium is a field hockey stadium in Bhopal, Madhya Pradesh, India. It has a seating capacity of more than 15,000 people. 

In 2009, a newly laid poly grass and flood light system was unveiled at the stadium. It is the home venue for the World Series Hockey team, Bhopal Badshahs. The Obaidullah Gold Cup hockey tournament is the major International tournament organize every year. 

In 2014, the Stadium hosted 4th Hockey India Senior Women National Championship 2014 (Division B) final where Assam beat Himachal Pradesh by 3–2.

Important Matches

References

Field hockey venues in India

Sports venues in Bhopal
2009 establishments in Madhya Pradesh
Sports venues completed in 2009